Antonio Valmor Assis Da Silva Junior (born 6 March 2000), commonly known as Juninho, is a Brazilian footballer who currently plays for Khor Fakkan.

Career statistics

Club

Notes

References

External links

2000 births
Living people
Brazilian footballers
Brazilian expatriate footballers
Association football forwards
UAE Pro League players
Associação Atlética Ponte Preta players
Khor Fakkan Sports Club players
Sharjah FC players
Expatriate footballers in the United Arab Emirates
Brazilian expatriate sportspeople in the United Arab Emirates